Ghosts of the Social Dead is the third album from Australian nu metal band Superheist, released on 28 October 2016. 
The album was announced on 26 June 2016 via social media, and a music video was released for the track "Hands Up High" on the band's YouTube channel on 10 August 2016. The second single "Fearing Nothing" was released on 7 October. The third single Wolves in your Headspace and accompanying music video was released on 27 November.

Track listing

Personnel
 Ezekiel Ox – vocals, acoustic guitar on tracks 7 and 9
 dw Norton – guitar, piano and keyboards
 Drew Dedman – bass, grand piano, synth programming on track 3 
 Benny Clark – drums

Background vocals on Fearing Nothing
 Dani Raushi, Mark "Stig" Daughney, Benny, Zeke, Drew, dw, Mr.Keir & Theron
Background vocals on This Truth
 Dani Raushi, Mark "Stig" Daughney, Benny, Zeke, Matt & dw
Gang vocals
 Dani Raushi, Mark "Stig" Daughney, Benny, Zeke, Drew, dw, Mr.Keir, Theron & Harrison
Portuguese Whispers on Wolves
 Daniel Pampuri

Production work
 Jay Baumgardner – production and mixing
 Kyle Hoffmann & Daniel Pampuri – engineering
 dw Norton – additional engineering
 Theron Rennison – Pro Tools operation
 Theron Rennison, Drew Dedman & Everyone Else – Pro Tools editing
 John Ruberto – mastering

Charts

References

Superheist albums
2016 albums